Munich East is an electoral constituency (German: Wahlkreis) represented in the Bundestag. It elects one member via first-past-the-post voting. Under the current constituency numbering system, it is designated as constituency 218. It is located in southern Bavaria, comprising the eastern part of the city of Munich.

Munich East was created for the inaugural 1949 federal election. Since 2013, it has been represented by Wolfgang Stefinger of the Christian Social Union (CSU).

Geography
Munich East is located in southern Bavaria. As of the 2021 federal election, it comprises the boroughs of Altstadt-Lehel (1), Au-Haidhausen (5), Bogenhausen (13), Berg am Laim (14), Trudering-Riem (15), and Ramersdorf-Perlach (16) from the independent city of Munich.

History
Munich East was created in 1949. In the 1949 election, it was Bavaria constituency 6 in the numbering system. In the 1953 through 1961 elections, it was number 201. In the 1965 through 1976 elections, it was number 206. In the 1980 through 1998 elections, it was number 205. In the 2002 and 2005 elections, it was number 220. In the 2009 and 2013 elections, it was number 219. Since the 2017 election, it has been number 218.

Originally, the constituency comprised the boroughs of Berg am Laim, Bogenhausen, Giesing, Haidhausen, Harlaching, Perlach, Ramersdorf, Riem, and Trudering. In the 1965 through 1990 elections, it lost the boroughs of Giesing and Harlaching while gaining the borough of Au. In the 1994 election, it lost the boroughs of Au and Haidhausen. It acquired its current borders in the 2002 election.

Members
The constituency was first represented by Franz Marx of the Social Democratic Party (SPD) from 1949 to 1953. Angelo Kramel of the Christian Social Union (CSU) was elected in 1953 and served a single term. Georg Lang of the CSU then served from 1957 to 1961. Former member Marx won the constituency in 1961 and served until 1972. He was succeeded by fellow SPD member Jürgen Vahlberg from 1972 to 1976. Rudolf Kraus won the constituency for the CSU in 1976, and served until 1990. Herbert Frankenhauser of the CSU was then representative from 1990 to 2013. Wolfgang Stefinger of the CSU was elected in 2013, and re-elected in 2017 and 2021.

Election results

2021 election

2017 election

2013 election

2009 election

References

Federal electoral districts in Bavaria
1949 establishments in West Germany
Constituencies established in 1949
Munich